Jörg Breu may refer to:
Jörg Breu the Elder (c. 1475 – 1537), painter of the German Danube school
Jörg Breu the Younger (1510–1547), son of Jörg Breu the Elder, was a painter of Augsburg